Henville is an English surname. Notable people with the surname include:

 Troy Archibald-Henville (born 1988), English footballer and coach
 Sandra Lee Henville (born 1938), American child actress
 Charles Henville Bayly
 William Henville Burford

English-language surnames